Malcolm Paul Mortimore (born 16 June 1953 in Wimbledon, London, England) is a drummer and percussionist who has played with Arthur Brown, Ian Dury, Herbie Flowers, Gentle Giant, Spike Heatley, Tom Jones, G.T. Moore, Mick and Chris Jagger, Oliver Jones and Barney Kessel, Frankie Miller, Chris Spedding, Troy Tate.

In the 2000s, he has toured with the Gentle Giant spin-off band Three Friends, Us (Derek Austin, Herbie Flowers, Chris Spedding), and Chris Jagger's Atcha. In 2020, he joined  Colosseum, replacing the late Jon Hiseman.

References

External links
 Official website

Living people
British rock drummers
British male drummers
People from Wimbledon, London
1953 births
Gentle Giant members